The Best of Mandy Moore  is the first greatest hits album from American singer Mandy Moore, released on November 16, 2004, by Epic Records. The compilation includes tracks from her first three studio albums as well as I Wanna Be with You in addition to a few tracks from soundtracks Moore was part of. As well as, music videos and live performances on a double disc.

The album debuted at number 148 on the US Billboard 200 chart. The album has sold 104,000 copies in the United States.

Content
Moore's earliest hit to be featured on the album is "Candy", the first single from her debut album So Real (1999). The two other songs that are included from So Real are "Walk Me Home" and "So Real". "I Wanna Be with You" was first featured on I Wanna Be with You (2000). "In My Pocket" was the first single from her self-titled second studio album. "Crush" was the album's second single following the mildly successful "In My Pocket". "Cry" and Moores cover of Only Hope by American band Switchfoot tied in with the romantic drama film A Walk to Remember, Moore's debut as a lead actress. Four songs from her third studio album Coverage (2003), were included, among which is Moore's own versions of "Have a Little Faith in Me" and "Senses Working Overtime". "Top of the World" was featured in the films Stuart Little 2, Bridge to Terabithia, and Surf's Up. The final track in the compilation is a cover of Doris Day's "Secret Love" from the Mona Lisa Smile soundtrack.

Critical reception

Allmusic writer Stephen Thomas Erlewine described the album as "one of the better artifacts of the teen pop boom" and "stronger and more enjoyable than almost any other teen pop record from its time."

Track listing

Charts

References

2004 greatest hits albums
Mandy Moore compilation albums
2004 video albums
Epic Records compilation albums
2004 live albums
Live video albums
Music video compilation albums
Epic Records live albums
Epic Records video albums